is a Japanese football club playing in the Kanto Soccer League, one of the Japanese Regional Leagues. The club aims for promotion to the Japan Football League.

The club was founded in 1953 as Saitama Teachers S.C. and competed in the old Japan Soccer League Division 2 in 1982 and 1983.

External links
Saitama S.C. website

 
Football clubs in Japan
Association football clubs established in 1953
Japan Soccer League clubs
1953 establishments in Japan